Stilpnochlora is a genus of phaneropterine katydids in the family Tettigoniidae. There are about 15 described species in Stilpnochlora.

Species
These 15 species belong to the genus Stilpnochlora:

References

Further reading

External links

 

Phaneropterinae